List of radio stations in the Upper West region of Ghana in no particular order.

 Here are some additions:
Radio Mak in Wa;

Radio Waa in Wa;

Sungmaale FM in Wa;

Wfm in Wa;

Bugli FM in Wa;

Home radio in Wa.

See also
Media of Ghana
 List of newspapers in Ghana
 List of radio stations in Ghana
Telecommunications in Ghana
New Media in Ghana

References

Upper West